Araneta Properties Inc. is a publicly listed real estate company involved in real estate development headed by Gregorio Maria Araneta III, a member of the Araneta family.

History
The Araneta Properties Inc. was originally incorporated as Integrated Chrome Corporation (INCHROME) on June 15, 1988, with operations involving in Ferrochrome and Chromite smelting. The company stopped its operations in January 1966, and changed its name to Araneta Properties Inc., with the business focusing more on real estate while maintaining its smelting operations.

The Araneta Properties Inc., along with Sta. Lucia Land Inc. signed a joint venture project in developing the Colinas Verdes Estates, a  estates in 2003, involving housing developments and a golf course. In November 2019, Araneta and Sta. Lucia announced an additional  expansion project. The company is also involved in the development of The Altaraza, a  residential and commercial venture with Ayala Land, both located at San Jose del Monte, Bulacan. The company now aims to develop a  new financial district in Caloocan, near the MRT 7 project.

References

Real estate companies of the Philippines
Real estate companies established in 1988
Companies based in Makati